The 2013–14 FIS Snowboard World Cup is a multi race tournament over a season for snowboarding. The World Cup was organised by the FIS which also runs world cups and championships in alpine skiing, cross-country skiing, ski jumping, Nordic combined, and freestyle skiing. The FIS Snowboarding World Cup consisted of the parallel slalom, snowboard cross and the halfpipe. The men's side of the world cup also consisted of a big air competition.

Calendar: Men

Parallel

Snowboard Cross

 cancelled in 17–19 January due to lack of snow; rescheduled to March.

Half-pipe

Slopestyle

Big Air

Ladies

Parallel

Snowboard Cross

 cancelled in 17–19 January due to lack of snow; rescheduled to March.

Half-pipe

Slopestyle

Standings

References

External links
 FIS Snowboard World Cup calendar
 FIS Snowboard World Cup results

FIS Snowboard World Cup
FIS Snowboard World Cup
FIS Snowboard World Cup
Qualification events for the 2014 Winter Olympics